Typhus vaccines are vaccines developed to protect against typhus. As of 2020 they are not commercially available.

One typhus vaccine consisted of formaldehyde-inactivated Rickettsia prowazekii.  Two doses were injected subcutaneously four weeks apart.  Booster doses were required every six to twelve months.

See also
 Hans Zinsser
 Rudolf Weigl
 Ludwik Fleck

References

Vaccines
Epidemic typhus